David Lipsky (born July 14, 1988) is an American professional golfer.

Lipsky played college golf at Northwestern University where he was an All-American and won the 2010 Big Ten individual championship.

Lipsky turned professional after graduating in 2011.  He joined the Asian Tour in 2012 and won the Handa Faldo Cambodian Classic in his third start on the tour. In 2014 he won the Omega European Masters, a European Tour event co-sanctioned by the Asian Tour; he went on to win the 2014 Asian Tour Order of Merit. Since that victory, he has competed predominantly on the European Tour and won for the second time at the Alfred Dunhill Championship in 2018. He has also played on the second-tier Korn Ferry Tour in the United States, winning once.

Early life
Lipsky is Jewish, and was born in Los Angeles, California, to Aaron Lipsky and Yon Suk Lipsky, who is from Korea. His parents introduced him to golf when he was 10 years old.

He lived in La Cañada Flintridge, California, and in high school at La Cañada High School, at which he was a 4.0 student, Lipsky won the 2003 Ashworth Postseason at Mission Hills, the 2004 Junior Tour Championship played at PGA West, and the Rio Hondo High School League Tournament in 2004 and 2005.  He was named Los Angeles all-Southern Section in 2004–06, MVP of the Rio Hondo League in 2004 and 2005, and First-team all-Los Angeles Area in 2005, while averaging a score of 36 in his last two seasons in high school. He graduated in 2006.

College
Lipsky played college golf at Northwestern University, which he attended on a partial scholarship and at which he majored in political science and history. He also caddied throughout college. In addition, he was also a member of the Rho Chapter of Beta Theta Pi.

In 2007–08, he had a number one finish with a 139 at the Notre Dame Invitational, and won the Jacksonville Dual Match with a 68.  Lipsky had a 74.47 stroke average. In 2008–09, he was All-Big Ten second-team, Golf Coaches Association of America (GCAA) PING All-Region, and Academic All-Big Ten.

In 2009–10 Lipsky won the 2010 Big Ten individual championship with a 72-hole total of 3-under 281.  He was All-Big Ten first-team, GCAA PING All-Midwest Region, and All-Academic Big Ten.  He had a 71.88 stroke average, the sixth-best season average in school history.

In 2010–11, at the UNCG Bridgestone Golf Collegiate he scored a 68-68-66 for a 14-under-par 202, tying Luke Donald's 54-hole tournament score school record. Lipsky was honored as All-American, GCAA PING All-America honorable mention, All-Big Ten first team, GCAA PING All-Region, Big Ten All-Championships Team, and Academic All-Big Ten.  He had a 72.02 stroke average in the regular season, seventh-best in school season history, and ended with a career 72.97 stroke average, the fourth-best in school history behind Luke Donald, Tom Johnson, and Jess Daley.

He turned professional after graduating in 2011.

Professional career
Lipsky was medalist at Asian Tour Qualifying School in January 2012. He won his third start on the tour, the 2012 Handa Faldo Cambodian Classic (earning $47,550 and a winner's exemption on the tour until the end of 2014), and finished 11th on the tour's Order of Merit as a rookie. He played on the Web.com Tour in 2013.

In May 2014, he came in second by one stroke to Chile's Felipe Aguilar in The Championship at Laguna National, which was jointly sanctioned by the Asian Tour and European Tour. Lipsky won the Omega European Masters (earning a career-best €383,330 ($497,000)) and finished the Asian Tour season leading the Order of Merit, which also earned him entry into his first major (2015 Open Championship) and first WGC event (2015 WGC-Cadillac Championship) and a European Tour exemption through 2016. He ended the year in the top 150 in world rankings.

On December 16, 2018, Lipsky won the Alfred Dunhill Championship at Leopard Creek Country Club in South Africa. This event was co-sanctioned by the European Tour and the Sunshine Tour.

Amateur wins
2010 Big Ten Championship

Professional wins (4)

European Tour wins (2)

1Co-sanctioned by the Asian Tour
2Co-sanctioned by the Sunshine Tour

European Tour playoff record (1–0)

Asian Tour wins (2)

1Co-sanctioned by the European Tour

Asian Tour playoff record (2–0)

Korn Ferry Tour wins (1)

Korn Ferry Tour playoff record (0–1)

Results in major championships

CUT = missed the half-way cut
"T" indicates a tie for a place

Results in The Players Championship

CUT = missed the halfway cut

Results in World Golf Championships
Results not in chronological order before 2015.

1Cancelled due to COVID-19 pandemic

NT = No tournament

"T" = Tied

See also
2021 Korn Ferry Tour Finals graduates
List of Jewish golfers

References

External links

American male golfers
Jewish golfers
Northwestern Wildcats men's golfers
Asian Tour golfers
European Tour golfers
PGA Tour golfers
Golfers from Los Angeles
Jewish American sportspeople
American sportspeople of Korean descent
People from La Cañada Flintridge, California
1988 births
Living people
21st-century American Jews